The Mayor of Waitakere City was the head of the former municipal government of Waitakere City, New Zealand, who presided over the Waitakere City Council. The city was New Zealand's fifth largest, and was part of the Auckland region. There were only two mayors of Waitakere City: Assid Corban, 1989–92; and Bob Harvey, 1992–2010. On 1 November 2010, Waitakere City became a part of the Auckland Council.

History
The city was formed by the amalgamation of the boroughs of Henderson, New Lynn, and Glen Eden into Waitakere City in the 1989 re-organisation of local government. On 1 November 2010, the city ceased to exist and was incorporated into the newly-created Auckland Council, coming under the leadership of the Mayor of Auckland, Len Brown.

Electoral system
The elected council consisted of the mayor and 14 councillors representing the four wards:
 Henderson Ward (4 councillors)
 Massey Ward (4 councillors)
 New Lynn Ward (4 councillors)
 Waitākere Ward (2 councillors)

The mayor was directly elected across the whole city council area using a First Past the Post electoral system. Each electoral term was for three years. The final mayor was Bob Harvey.

List of mayors of Waitakere City

References

 
Waitakere